Vincenzo De Liguori (born 5 October 1979) is an Italian professional footballer who played in Serie B for Nocerina.

Biography

Juve Stabia
Born in Naples, Campania, De Liguori made his professional debut in round 32 of 1996–97 Serie C1 for Campania team Juve Stabia.

Ancona
In August 2000 De Liguori was signed by Serie B club Ancona. In October he returned to Serie C1 for Viterbese.

Taranto
He was signed by Taranto Calcio in temporary deal in 2001. The contract was turned to co-ownership deal circa 2002. In June 2003 Taranto acquired De Liguori outright from Ancona. He also spent a season with Campania team FC Sporting Benevento in 2004–05 Serie C1, after Taranto relegated to Serie C2 in 2004 due to bankruptcy. De Liguori returned to Taranto (now as Taranto Sport) in 2005 as free agent, after the bankruptcy of Benevento. De Liguori won promotion playoffs with Taranto in 2006, brought the club back to Serie C1. In January 2008 De Liguori was signed by the Campania club again, now run as Benevento Calcio S.p.A.

Benevento
De Liguori spent  years in Benevento. The club was the losing side of promotion playoffs successively in 2008–09 and 2009–10 Lega Pro Prima Divisione. In 2010, he was signed by Nocerina, yet another Campania team. The team won promotion to Serie B in 2011 as the champion of group B of 2010–11 Lega Pro Prima Divisione. Nocerina relegated back to L.P. Prime Division in 2012. De Liguori also returned to that division in January 2012, for Barletta in temporary deal. De Liguori played his last game for Nocerina in 2013 promotion playoffs.

Honours
 Supercoppa di Lega di Prima Divisione: 2011 (Nocerina)
 Lega Pro Prima Divisione: 2011 (Nocerina)
 Lega Pro Seconda Divisione: 2008 (Benevento)

References

External links
 Lega Serie B profile 

Italian footballers
S.S. Juve Stabia players
A.C. Ancona players
U.S. Viterbese 1908 players
Taranto F.C. 1927 players
Benevento Calcio players
A.S.G. Nocerina players
A.S.D. Barletta 1922 players
Association football midfielders
Serie B players
Serie C players
Footballers from Naples
1979 births
Living people